The 2016 Campeonato Paraense Final was the final that decided the 2016 Campeonato Paraense, the 104th season of the Campeonato Paraense. The final were contested between Paysandu and São Francisco.

Paysandu defeated São Francisco 2–1 to win their 46th Campeonato Paraense title.

Teams

Match

Details

See also
2017 Copa Verde
2017 Copa do Brasil

References

Campeonato Paraense Final